The Chicago Cats was an American soccer club based in Chicago, Illinois that was a member of the American Soccer League. They played their home games at Hanson Stadium in Chicago's Belmont-Cragin community.

Year-by-year

Note: The 1976 Chicago Cats were declared by ASL commissioner Bob Cousy to have forfeited an unplayed, season-ending match against Cleveland. The forfeit leveled the two teams with 80 points. At the same time Commissioner Cousy controversially gave the final playoff spot to Cleveland, even though Chicago held the first two tiebreakers; wins and goal-differential.

Coaches
 Mike Grbic (1975)
 George Meyer (1976)

References

External links
The Year in American Soccer - 1975
The Year in American Soccer - 1976

Soccer clubs in Chicago
Defunct soccer clubs in Illinois
American Soccer League (1933–1983) teams
1975 establishments in Illinois
1976 disestablishments in Illinois
Association football clubs established in 1975
Association football clubs disestablished in 1976